Wolterstorffina, also known as Wolterstorff toads, is a genus of "true toads" (family Bufonidae) native to Nigeria and Cameroon. Its sister taxon is either genus Werneria or the clade Werneria+Nectophryne. The name of the genus honours German geologist and herpetologist Willy Wolterstorff.

Species
The three species are:
Wolterstorffina chirioi   
Wolterstorffina mirei  Mount Oku Wolterstorff toad
Wolterstorffina parvipalmata  Cameroon Wolterstorff toad

References

External links
  taxon Wolterstorffina at http://www.eol.org.
  Taxon Wolterstorffina at http://data.gbif.org/welcome.htm

 
Amphibian genera
Amphibians of Sub-Saharan Africa
Taxa named by Robert Mertens